Torup Castle is a castle in Svedala Municipality, Scania, in southern Sweden. It was constructed by Görvel Fadersdotter (Sparre) for her son, after the death of her second spouse, Danish Privy Council Truid Gregersen Ulfstand (1487–1545).

See also
List of castles in Sweden

Sources 

Castles in Skåne County